George Chiang is a Canadian actor, writer, lyricist, composer and producer.  Chiang has created several award-winning projects including the musical, Golden Lotus, the children's book, The Railroad Adventures of Chen Sing and the song and music video for A World Away (Remix).

Acting
Chiang began his acting career appearing in many plays in Toronto. He received critical praise for his performances in David Henry Hwang's, The Dance and the Railroad, Serpent Kills, and Urban Donnelleys, which he co-created. He also spent a season, as a member of the acting company, at Canada's flagship theatre, the Stratford Shakespeare Festival, where he performed in Othello and Twelfth Night. Since then Chiang has appeared in other theatre productions such as The King and I and many film and television productions which include, Disney's Eloise at the Plaza, American Girl's McKenna Shoots for the Stars, Mary Kills People, Dark Matter (TV Series) among many others.

Musicals

Chiang wrote and composed the musical Golden Lotus, which is an adaptation of the classic Chinese novel Jin Ping Mei. The story follows the plight of young woman who journeys into a bloody path of forbidden love and passion as the world around her burns into ashes. Golden Lotus is a sung through musical with a score that is a blend of pop rock songs mixed with Chinese instrumentation. Golden Lotus was the first Canadian musical ever presented at the ASCAP Foundation/Disney Theatrical Productions Musical Theatre Workshop in New York, artistic directed by Stephen Schwartz.  The musical received its world premiere on September 12, 2014, at the Y-Theatre in Hong Kong.  The score and its signature pop love song, "A World Away", were unanimously praised by critics. The production garnered three Hong Kong English Drama Award nominations for "Best Show", "Best Actress" and won for "Best Original Work" at the 2015 Hecklers Awards.

Film

The Hong Kong world premiere production of Golden lotus was captured live during four consecutive performances and edited into a feature-length film. The musical film produced by Chiang was released in September, 2021 to film festivals around the world the film has received critical praise. "The most important part of any musical is the music itself and it is here that 'Golden Lotus' manages to shine.  The actors sing perfectly, the music aiding their performances in a magical way .... Sure to be a cultural phenomenon, the Golden Lotus is a mesmerizing achievement with stunning choreography and equally stunning physical performances."  The musical film has been widely acclaimed and garnered dozens of awards across the globe.

Music and music videos

Golden Lotus: Sounds From The Musical was released on May 31, 2015.  It is an album consisting of fifteen songs from the Hong Kong production of Golden Lotus, written, composed and produced by Chiang, as they appeared in the Hong Kong world premiere. Recorded in Toronto with Harriet Chung as Golden Lotus, Charles Azulay as Wu Sung, Thom Allison as Xi Men, George Chiang as Wu Da, Stacey-Lea Marhue as Madam Wang, Scott Watanabe as the District Intendant, Pierre Bayuga as the Fruit Peddler and Josette Jorge as Ping.  It was music directed by Tim Stiff with arrangements by George Gao.
A newly arranged single of A World Away, from his musical Golden Lotus, titled A World Away (Remix) was sung by Harriet Chung and released on August 25, 2020.  The single was produced by Hayward Parrot, arranged by Warren Robert and recorded with a live orchestra in Toronto. The music video for A World Away (Remix), produced by Chiang and directed by Theresa Kowall-Shipp, has won numerous Best Music Video Awards from the World Distribution Award, Canadian Cinematography Awards, World Film Carnival - Singapore, Silver Mask Live Festival - Los Angeles, Rome Movie Awards, Amsterdam International Film Festival.

Books

The Railroad Adventures of Chen Sing  concerns a teenage boy who ventures to North America to build the transcontinental railway through the Rocky Mountains. There are disasters, encounters with wild animals, friendships and unforeseen events that mark Sing's journey.  The book was inspired by stories told to Chiang by Ike Sing whose father is the title character of the book.  The chapter book for young readers, published in March, 2017 contains full colour illustrations by Jessica Warner and is available in hardcover, paperback and ebook formats.
The book has won numerous awards such as the Pacific Book Award, two Global Ebook Awards, the Reader Views Reviewers Choice and the Pinnacle Book Achievement Award.

Awards & Nominations

Theatre

Film

Music & Music Videos

Books

References

External links
Official Website Golden Lotus
 Official Website George Chiang

Golden Lotus at IMDb
A World Away (Remix) at IMDb

Year of birth missing (living people)
Living people
Canadian people of Taiwanese descent
University of Guelph alumni
Nipissing University alumni
Canadian male actors of Taiwanese descent
Male actors from Ottawa
Canadian male film actors
Canadian male television actors